J. S. Marcus is an American novelist.

His work appeared in Harper's, The New York Review of Books, and The Wall Street Journal, where he regularly writes about real estate and art.

Awards
 Santa Maddalena Foundation fellow
 1992 Whiting Award

Works

Anthologies

References

https://muckrack.com/j-s-marcus

External links
Profile at The Whiting Foundation

20th-century American novelists
American male novelists
Living people
American gay writers
American LGBT novelists
20th-century American male writers
Year of birth missing (living people)